"Therefore I Am" is a song by American singer-songwriter Billie Eilish and the second single from her second studio album, Happier Than Ever (2021). It was released on November 12, 2020, through Darkroom and Interscope Records. It is an uptempo, hip hop-influenced pop, dark pop, R&B, and electropop track. Eilish wrote the song with its producer, Finneas O'Connell.

The song received positive reviews from music critics, with many of them comparing it to Eilish's hit single "Bad Guy". "Therefore I Am" was featured in 2020 year-end lists by multiple publications, including Billboard, NME, and Uproxx. The song peaked at number two on the US Billboard Hot 100, giving Eilish her fourth top-10 hit in the United States. The song further reached the top five on the Billboard airplay Hot Rock & Alternative Songs and Mainstream Top 40 charts. It peaked at number one on the singles charts in Greece, Ireland, Lithuania, and New Zealand, alongside receiving a platinum certification in Canada from Music Canada (MC).

The song's music video, directed by Eilish herself and filmed inside the Glendale Galleria shopping mall in California, premiered on the same day as the single release. In the video, Eilish is by herself in the empty shopping mall, eating and drinking various foods and beverages from Wetzel's Pretzels, Hot Dog on a Stick, and Chipotle Mexican Grill. Eilish performed the song at American Music Awards of 2020 in November 2020 and as part of a concert film and a world tour in support of Happier Than Ever.

Background and development
Development for "Therefore I Am" began in January 2020, and continued throughout quarantine during the COVID-19 pandemic. On September 14, 2020, during an Instagram Live session, Eilish revealed she would release a new song and music video. On November 9, 2020, Eilish announced on social media that "Therefore I Am" would be released on November 12, 2020, while simultaneously revealing the cover art. In an interview with Zane Lowe on Apple Music 1, Eilish explained: "You know this song is very, very up for interpretation. I'm very curious to see what people get from it and also what they feel when they hear it. It was very fun to complete. It was fun to record. I feel like you can hear it. I feel that I sound very much like…I'm just fucking around. I'm just joking. It's like, come on. It's so real. I feel like a natural, and don't take me seriously, you know? I love it."

Composition and lyrics
Musically, "Therefore I Am" is an uptempo pop, dark pop, R&B, and electropop track, that has hip-hop influences. Both the title and corresponding line are a reference to Cogito, ergo sum, a philosophical statement coined by René Descartes. Music critics have commented that the song features instrumentation consisting of a bassline, kick drum, "disaffected vocal performance" and a "swaggering beat". Moreover, the track uses a synthesizer throughout the hook and has braggadocios rapped verses in between each hook.

Lyrically, Eilish sings about disregarding people's opinions towards her. She explains that she is an individual with a mind of her own and does not require anybody making decisions on her behalf. In the chorus, Eilish makes fun of an unknown person, telling them that they believe they are "the man", while beginning to wonder the reality of existence. As the song continues, Eilish does not feel the person is what they believe themselves to be. In the first verse, Eilish expresses disdain towards the constant media coverage about her and demands the charlatans to stop speaking her name as if they know her personally. Laura English of Music Feeds theorized that she is singing about "articles about her baggy getups to paparazzi shots when she wears normal clothes". In the bridge, Eilish laughs as she claims she does not know who the person is, repeating: "I'm sorry, I don't think I caught your name".

Critical reception
"Therefore I Am" was met with positive reviews from music critics. Glenn Rowley of Billboard mentions that the song has Eilish's "signature throbbing beats" and "whispery vocals". In a five-star review, Thomas Smith of NME noted that Eilish "fuses critical philosophy with a swipe at the haters on her thrilling new single, a deliciously spicy tale that will no doubt have fans decoding every line". Rachael Dowd of Alternative Press commented that the song "shows another side to [Eilish] some may have never seen before". Good Morning America Josh Johnson described the song as a sequel to Eilish's number one hit "Bad Guy".

Mike Wass of Idolator viewed the song as a "defiant banger" and said it was "easily her catchiest and most commercial song since "Bad Guy". Steffanee Wang of Nylon cited that the song is a "dark-sounding bange" and "sheds the self-seriousness of her last few releases and lets loose". Slant Magazine Alexa Camp analyzed that the song is a "stark contrast" compared to her two previously released singles, "No Time to Die" and "My Future". Jordan Robledo of the Gay Times lauded the songs "eerie" sound, "hypnotizing" vocals, and its "unapologetic" lyrics. He thought the song was a "bop from start to finish". In his review for The New York Times, Jon Pareles said "Therefore I Am" was a "relatively minor addition to [Eilish's] catalog" but mentioned it "has attitude enough to get by". The song featured on 2020 year-end lists by Billboard (14), Consequence of Sound (24), NME (14), and Uproxx (50).

Accolades

Release and commercial performance
"Therefore I Am" was released digitally on Thursday, November 12, 2020. It was serviced to Australian and Italian radio stations the next day. It was serviced to the US alternative contemporary and contemporary hit radios on November 17. It was released to the US adult contemporary radio stations on December 7.

"Therefore I Am" debuted at number 94 on the US Billboard Hot 100 with 3.1 million streams, 5,000 downloads, and 11.7 million radio airplay audience impressions in its first four days of tracking. The song rose to number two on the chart the next week after it drew 24.2 million streams, 14,000 downloads, and 18.3 million radio airplay audience impressions, giving Eilish her fourth top-10 hit in the United States and 20th total Hot 100 hit. With a vault of 92 positions, "Therefore I Am" made the fourth-greatest leap in the Hot 100's history. The song also peaked within the top five on the US Billboard airplay Hot Rock & Alternative Songs chart, and topped the Mainstream Top 40 chart, her second number one on the latter chart. It reached number two in Canada and received a platinum certification by Music Canada (MC) for track-equivalent sales of 80,000 units.

The song also reached number two on the UK Singles Chart and received a silver certification from the British Phonographic Industry (BPI), which denotes track-equivalent sales of 200,000 units. "Therefore I Am" peaked at number one on the singles charts in Greece, Ireland, Lithuania, and New Zealand. It further reached the top five in Australia, Austria, Denmark, Finland, Germany, Hungary, Israel, Portugal, Singapore, Sweden, and Switzerland. The song also peaked within the top 20 in the Czech Republic, Italy, Malaysia, the Netherlands, and both the Belgium Flanders and Wallonia charts.

Music video

Background
A music video for "Therefore I Am" premiered on Eilish's YouTube channel on November 12, 2020. The video was solely directed by Eilish. It was shot inside the Glendale Galleria shopping mall in California, where she would frequently go when she was a young teenager. Eilish told Lowe about the visual: "The video is just the way that the song feels to me—careless and not really trying. The video, we, number one, shot on an iPhone, which we didn't even mean to do". She described the video as both "random" and "chaotic", and revealed that it was filmed overnight with "barely any crew". Fans believe Eilish made the music video in order to prove that she does not care what people think about her body.

Synopsis and reception

The video begins with Eilish, dressed in both a baggy white cardigan that has graffitied symbols and patches, and a pair of shorts, walking around an empty shopping mall alone. As the song's beat kicks in, Eilish begins to dance wildly throughout the mall. The singer helps herself to food and drinks from Wetzel's Pretzels, Hot Dog on a Stick, and Chipotle Mexican Grill. Thereafter, Eilish ascends an escalator, and sings the chorus while eating the food acquired in the video. The video concludes with an off-screen security guard yelling at Eilish, instructing her to leave the building; the singer flees from the mall into a parking garage.

Writing for The Fader, Jordan Darville compared the visual to Fatboy Slim's "Weapon of Choice"  music video (2001), but said it had "less dancing and more french fries". Patrick Hosken of MTV noted the video captures a feeling of "estrangement" and "isolation". He mentioned that Eilish was not "implicitly haunted by the shuttered shops and eerie emptiness", while adding the video evokes "Dawn of the Dead suburban post-apocalyptica" and plays like a "nuclear-fallout version of New Radicals's beloved late-'90s kids-take-over-the-mall anthem, 'You Get What You Give'". Liam Hess, writing for Vogue magazine, stated the video offered a "mall rat-inspired twist on a signature Eilish silhouette—and marked a welcome return for one of pop's most agenda-setting style stars". The staff of Paper magazine noted the production has a "lo-fi handheld camera quality", and hypothesized that Eilish and her crew spent their budget on renting out the mall.

Live performances
To further promote "Therefore I Am", Eilish performed the song for first time at the American Music Awards of 2020 on November 22. She included it in the Disney+ concert film Happier Than Ever: A Love Letter to Los Angeles, released on September 3, 2021. Eilish also performed "Therefore I Am" it in the set list of an ongoing world tour (2022–2023) in support of Happier Than Ever.

Credits and personnel
Credits adapted from Tidal.

 Billie Eilish vocals, songwriter
 Finneas producer, songwriter, recording engineer
 Rob Kinelski mixer
 Dave Kutch mastering engineer
 Mourad Lagsir  mastering engineer

Charts

Weekly charts

Year-end charts

Certifications

Release history

References

2020 singles
2020 songs
Billie Eilish songs
Interscope Records singles
Irish Singles Chart number-one singles
Number-one singles in New Zealand
Songs written by Billie Eilish
Songs written by Finneas O'Connell
Song recordings produced by Finneas O'Connell
Songs about the media